Off-modern, a word invented by Svetlana Boym, is defined as a detour into the unexplored potentials of the modern project. It recovers unforeseen pasts and ventures into the side-alleys of modern history at the margins of error of major philosophical, economic and technological narratives of modernization and progress. Off-modern reflection involves exploration of the lateral potentialities of the project of critical modernity. In other words, it opens into the “modernity of what if” rather than simply modernization as it is. As such, the term can be understood as an intervention in the larger theoretical discussion surrounding modernity, postmodernity, hypermodernity, altermodernity, late modernity, and post-postmodernism. 

The word "off-modern” was coined by Boym in The Future of Nostalgia, finished in 2000 and published in 2001. The concept became elaborated in the first decade of the 21st century in The Off-Modern Manifesto (2003–2004) and The Architecture of the Off-Modern (2008) and in her media projects “Cities in Transit,” “Portable Homes,” “Black Mirrors” and “Hydrant Diaspora.” The Off-Modern Manifesto circulated on the web from Cyprus to New Delhi, from Zagreb to New Zealand and was republished in NeMe and in Art-e-fact and ArtMargins. The term was embraced by other artists including the RAQs collective from New Delhi as well as the Albanian (and international) artist Anri Sala and many others like the Off Modern group in South London who, since 2008 have been exploring the idea of the Off Modern through impromptu artistic happenings.

In Boym's own words, "the adverb off confuses our sense of direction; it makes us explore slideshadows and backalleys rather than the straight road of progress; it allows us to take a detour from the deterministic narrative of twentieth-century history. Off-modernism offered a critique of both the modern fascination with newness and no less modern reinvention of tradition. In the off-modern tradition, reflection and longing, estrangement and affection go together" (Boym, The Future of Nostalgia, 2001, pp. xvi-xvii).

Selected bibliography
 Svetlana Boym, The Future of Nostalgia  (Basic Books, 2001)
 Svetlana Boym, "Architecture of the Off-Modern" (Princeton Architectural Press, 2008)
 Svetlana Boym, Another Freedom:The Alternative History of an Idea (The University of Chicago Press, 2010)

Notes and references

External links 
 The Off-Modern Manifestos
 The Off-Modern Mirror, e-flux Journal 2010
 Off Modern arts collective in South East London
 The O.M. Manifesto

Art manifestos